"A New Level" is a song by American heavy metal band Pantera. It is the second track on their 1992 studio album Vulgar Display of Power.

Background and composition 
The song is composed in the key of A minor. It was demoed before producer Terry Date came in to work on the album. Pantera's vocalist Phil Anselmo commented about the song: "A New Level was the ultimate chip-on-your-shoulder-type song at the time for me."

Bassist Rex Brown wrote about the song in his book Official Truth, 101 Proof: "Sometimes we'd sit in the studio until four in the morning, just coming up with different ideas... Every single track we recorded had that certain something about it in a way that only the most vital albums can boast. When we did 'A New Level,' there were all these weird chromatic chords that we hadn't even tried before, and as it took shape it was like opening a Christmas present that you never thought you'd get in a million years."

Reception 

Metal Hammer ranked "A New Level" #11 on their list of the 50 best Pantera songs. They wrote: "A series of visceral, fidgeting riffs gives way to that immortal chorus: 'A new level of confidence and power…' It pretty much summed up the whole Vulgar Display… album."

Guitar World considered "A New Level" to be the 3rd best Pantera song, writing that it is "arguably as well known as any of the Vulgar Display of Power cuts that were." They also wrote: "Its intro riff, built on a slowly ascending barrage of crushing chromatics, is as iconic as the opening of 'Walk' or 'Mouth for War'".

Guitar World also ranked the song's solo number 5 on their list "The 25 Greatest Wah Solos of All Time".

Odyssey also considered "A New Level" to be the 3rd best Pantera song, rating it 5/5 and wrote that the purpose of the song "was to demonstrate that Pantera was on a new level above everyone else in metal".

Revolver Magazine hosted a fan poll on the five best songs from Vulgar Display of Power and "A New Level" came second place.

Spin writer Mike Gitter described the song as "anthemic".

Madonna performance 
Pop singer Madonna performed a riff from "A New Level" on her Sticky & Sweet Tour. It was her long-time guitarist, Monte Pittman, who taught her the riff. She performed it during a medley version of her song "Hung Up". Anselmo considered this to be strange, and said: "She's never reached out to any of us, so I appreciate her homage, but I just don't understand it. But props to her for doing it."

Personnel 
 Phil Anselmo – vocals
 Dimebag Darrell – guitar
 Rex Brown – bass
 Vinnie Paul – drums

References 

1992 songs
Pantera songs
Songs written by Dimebag Darrell
Songs written by Vinnie Paul
Songs written by Phil Anselmo
Songs written by Rex Brown